Potemnemus trimaculatus is a species of beetle in the family Cerambycidae. It is known from Papua New Guinea and Australia.
It feeds on Araucaria cunninghamii.

References

Lamiini
Beetles described in 1918